The Styrian motorcycle Grand Prix was a motorcycling event that was introduced during the 2020 Grand Prix motorcycle racing season and retained for the 2021 season as a response to the COVID-19 pandemic. For 2021, it replaced the initially scheduled Finnish Grand Prix as the 10th round of the season.

Official names and sponsors
2020: BMW M Grand Prix of Styria
2021: Michelin Grand Prix of Styria

Winners of the Styrian motorcycle Grand Prix

Multiple winners (riders)

Multiple winners (manufacturers)

By year

References

Motorcycle Grands Prix
Motorcycle racing in Austria
2020 establishments in Austria
Recurring sporting events established in 2020